What Are You Waiting For is the fourth album of Dutch band Krezip. It is the first album released with their new label Sony BMG. The album peaked at #1 in the Dutch Mega Album Top 100.

Album information
In 2004 Krezip lost their record label. This was because Warner Music BeNeLux had to drop out all their national artist. Very soon after the drop out Krezip got another record deal with Sony BMG, where this was their first release.

In addition to make the album, Jacqueline Govaert (singer of the band) flew to the United States to write for the album with several writers. The album is also produced in the U.S. with the famous producer-couple Wizardz of Oz (Andrew Bojanic and Liz Hooper), who also worked with artist like Avril Lavigne and Britney Spears. All the songs are written by Jacqueline Govaert with co-writers.

The song "Same Mistake" was used in the Dutch movie Schnitzel Paradise (Het Schnitzelparadijs) which became a huge hit in the Netherlands.

Singles
 Out Of My Bed
 Don't Crush Me
 I Apologize

Singles charts

Track listing

Charts

Weekly charts

Year-end charts

External links
 Official website

References

2005 albums
Krezip albums